Lukla is a small town in the Khumbu Pasanglhamu rural municipality of the Solukhumbu District in the Province No. 1 of north-eastern Nepal. Although Lukla means "place with many goats and sheep", few are found in the area nowadays.

Lukla contains a small airport serving the region, and a variety of shops and lodges catering to tourists and trekkers, providing western-style meals and trail supplies. From Lukla, travellers need two days to reach the village Namche Bazaar, an altitude-acclimatization stop for those continuing on. In August 2014, the Nepalese government announced plans to open the first tarmac road from Kathmandu to Lukla.

Airport

Lukla is served by the Tenzing-Hillary Airport. Weather permitting, twin-engined Dornier 228s and de Havilland Canada Twin Otters make frequent daylight flights between Lukla and Kathmandu. Lukla Airport has a very short and steep airstrip, often compounded by hazardous weather, resulting in several fatal accidents. It has been called the most dangerous airport in the world.

Climate
Lukla has a monsoon influenced subalpine climate (Köppen classification Dwc) with cool summers and cold winters. High diurnal temperature variation occrs, and temperatures can reach freezing even in the middle of summer.

See also

References

External links

Populated places in Solukhumbu District
Tourism in Nepal
Khumbu Pasanglhamu